Zhukovo is a rural locality (a village) in Verkhneshardengskoye Rural Settlement, Velikoustyugsky District, Vologda Oblast, Russia. The population was 7 as of 2002.

Geography 
Zhukovo is located 52 km south of Veliky Ustyug (the district's administrative centre) by road. Verkhnyaya Shardenga is the nearest rural locality.

References 

Rural localities in Velikoustyugsky District